Highway M10 is a Ukrainian international highway (M-highway) connecting Lviv to Krakovets on the border with Poland, where it continues as the A4 motorway.

There are plans to build a motorway along this route in the coming years. This was supposed to be done by a private investor but for the last 10 years these efforts did not succeed.  Now the government of Ukraine will try to find the funding.

Route

See also

 Roads in Ukraine
 Ukraine Highways
 International E-road network
 Pan-European corridors

References

External links
 International Roads in Ukraine in Russian
 European Roads in Russian

Roads in Lviv Oblast
European route E40